Keshpur is a village in the Keshpur CD block in the Medinipur Sadar subdivision of the Paschim Medinipur district  in the state of West Bengal, India.

Geography

Location

Area overview
Paschim Medinipur district (before separation of Jhargram) had a total forest area of 1,700 km2, accounting for 14.31% of the total forested area of the state. It is obvious from the map of the Midnapore  Sadar subdivision, placed alongside, is that there are large stretches of forests in the subdivision. The soil is predominantly lateritic. Around 30% of the population of the district resides in this subdivision. 13.95% of the population lives in urban areas and 86.05% lives in the rural areas.

Note: The map alongside presents some of the notable locations in the subdivision. All places marked in the map are linked in the larger full screen map.

Demographics
According to the 2011 Census of India Keshpur had a total population of 4,577 of which 2,311 (50%) were males and 2,266 (50%) were females. Population in the age range 0–6 years was 601. The total number of literate persons in Keshpur was 3,242 (70.83% of the population over 6 years).

Civic administration

CD block HQ
The headquarters of Keshpur block located at Keshpur.

Police station
Keshpur police station has jurisdiction over a part of Keshpur  CD block.

Transport
SH 7 running from Rajgram (in Murshidabad district) to Midnapore (in Paschim Medinipur district) passes through Keshpur .

Education
Sukumar Sengupta Mahavidyalaya was established in 2004 and is affiliated to Vidyasagar University. It offers undergraduate courses in arts and science.

Healthcare
Keshpur Rural Hospital, with 30 beds at Keshpur is the major government medical facility in the Keshpur CD block.

References

Villages in Paschim Medinipur district